A trans-Earth injection (TEI) is a propulsion maneuver used to set a spacecraft on a trajectory which will intersect the Earth's sphere of influence, usually putting the spacecraft on a free return trajectory.

The maneuver is performed by a rocket engine.

From the Moon
The spacecraft is usually in a parking orbit around the Moon at the time of TEI, in which case the burn is timed so that its midpoint is opposite the Earth's location upon arrival.  Uncrewed space probes have also performed this maneuver from the Moon starting with Luna 16's direct ascent traverse from the lunar surface  in 1970. 

On the Apollo missions, it was performed by the restartable Service Propulsion System (SPS) engine on the Service Module after the undocking of the (LM) Lunar Module if provided. An Apollo TEI burn lasted approximately 150 seconds, providing a posigrade velocity increase of 1,000 m/s (3,300 ft/s). It was first performed by the Apollo 8 mission on December 25, 1968.

From outside the Earth-Moon system
In 2004, from outside the Earth-Moon system, the Stardust probe comet dust return mission performed TEI after visiting Comet Wild 2.

See also
Lunar orbit insertion
Trans-lunar injection
Trans-Mars injection

References

Astrodynamics
Spacecraft propulsion
Exploration of the Moon
Apollo program